Gulborg Nygaard (18 April 1902 – 17 April 1991) was a Norwegian politician for the Liberal Party.

She served as a deputy representative to the Norwegian Parliament from Vest-Agder during the term of 1954–1957.

References

1902 births
1991 deaths
Liberal Party (Norway) politicians
Deputy members of the Storting